The year 2016 is the 7th year in the history of Australian Fighting Championship (AFC), a mixed martial arts promotion based in Australia. In 2016 AFC held 3 events.

Events list

AFC 17 

AFC 17 was an event held on October 15, 2016, at Melbourne Pavilion in Melbourne, Australia.

Results

AFC 16 

AFC 16 was an event held on June 18, 2016, at Melbourne Pavilion in Melbourne, Australia.

Results

AFC 15 

AFC 15 was an event held on March 19, 2016, at Melbourne Pavilion in Melbourne, Australia.

Results

References 

2016 in mixed martial arts
2016 in Australian sport
AFC (mixed martial arts) events